Saskia (minor planet designation: 461 Saskia), provisional designation , is a Themistian asteroid from the outer regions of the asteroid belt, approximately  in diameter. It was discovered on 22 October 1900, by German astronomer Max Wolf at the Heidelberg Observatory in southwest Germany. The X-type asteroid has a rotation period of 7.3 hours. It was named after Rembrandt's wife, Saskia van Uylenburgh.

Orbit and classification 

Saskia is a core member of the carbonaceous Themis family, one of the largest asteroid families named after 24 Themis. It orbits the Sun in the outer asteroid belt at a distance of 2.7–3.6 AU once every 5 years and 6 months (2,016 days; semi-major axis of 3.12 AU). Its orbit has an eccentricity of 0.14 and an inclination of 1° with respect to the ecliptic. The body's observation arc begins at Heidelberg the night after its official discovery observation.

Naming 

This minor planet was named after Saskia van Uylenburgh (1612–1642), wife of renowned Dutch painter Rembrandt (4511 Rembrandt). The official naming citation was mentioned in The Names of the Minor Planets by Paul Herget in 1955.

Physical characteristics 

In the Tholen classification, this asteroid's spectral type is ambiguous, closest to a dark F-type asteroid, and somewhat similar to that of a C- and X-type (FCX), while in both the Tholen- and SMASS-like taxonomy of the Small Solar System Objects Spectroscopic Survey (S3OS2), Saskia is an X-type asteroid. It has also been characterized as a primitive P-type asteroid by the Wide-field Infrared Survey Explorer (WISE).

Rotation period 

In April 2007, a rotational lightcurve of Saskia was obtained from photometric observations by French amateur astronomer Pierre Antonini. Lightcurve analysis gave a well-defined rotation period of  hours with a brightness variation of 0.36 magnitude. In December 2016, an identical period with an amplitude of 0.28 magnitude was determined by Daniel Klinglesmith at Etscorn Campus Observatory , New Mexico. This result supersedes two previous observations that gave a period of 7.34 and 7.349 hours, respectively.

Diameter and albedo 

According to the survey carried out by the NEOWISE mission of NASA's WISE telescope, Saskia measures between 39.8 and 44.1 kilometers in diameter and its surface has an albedo between 0.06 and 0.112, while the Japanese Akari satellite determined a diameter of 43.10 kilometers with an albedo of 0.069. The Collaborative Asteroid Lightcurve Link assumes an albedo of 0.10 and derives a smaller diameter of 33.69 kilometers based on an absolute magnitude of 10.48.

References

External links 
 Asteroid Lightcurve Database (LCDB), query form (info )
 Dictionary of Minor Planet Names, Google books
 Asteroids and comets rotation curves, CdR – Observatoire de Genève, Raoul Behrend
 Discovery Circumstances: Numbered Minor Planets (1)-(5000) – Minor Planet Center
 
 

000461
Discoveries by Max Wolf
Named minor planets
000461
19001022